Attila Ughy (born 3 September 1969) is a Hungarian politician, member of the National Assembly (MP) for Pestszentlőrinc (Budapest Constituency XXVII) between 2010 and 2014. He was also MP from the Budapest Regional List of Fidesz between 1998 and 2002. He was elected mayor of Pestszentlőrinc (District XVIII, Budapest) during the local elections held in 2010. He was re-elected in 2014, but was defeated by Sándor Szaniszló (MSZP) in 2019.

References

1969 births
Living people
Eötvös Loránd University alumni
Corvinus University of Budapest alumni
Mayors of places in Hungary
Fidesz politicians
Members of the National Assembly of Hungary (1998–2002)
Members of the National Assembly of Hungary (2010–2014)
Politicians from Budapest